Riedlingsdorf is a municipality in Burgenland in the district Oberwart in Austria.

History
Until 1921 Riedlingsdorf belonged to Hungary, like the whole of Burgenland.

Population

Politics
Of the 19 positions on the municipal council, the SPÖ has 14, the ÖVP 4, and the FPÖ 1.

References

Cities and towns in Oberwart District